Ann Jäderlund (born 1955) is a Swedish poet and playwright. She made her literary debut in 1985 with the poetry collection Vimpelstaden. Other collections are Snart går jag i sommaren ut from 1990 and I en cylinder i vattnet av vattengråt from 2006. She was awarded the Dobloug Prize in 2004.  Esa-Pekka Salonen used her work Two Poems to Songs for a choral work in 2002.

Jäderlund has had a collaboration with the artists Agnes Monus and Mikael Lundberg and the poet Magnus William-Olsson, who resulted in an exhibition at the Moderna Museet in Stockholm in 2009. She has received her poem suite "Purpurbit" compared by Staffan Odenhall. Jäderlund has also translated poems by Emily Dickinson into Swedish.

References

1955 births
Living people
20th-century Swedish poets
20th-century Swedish dramatists and playwrights
Dobloug Prize winners
Swedish women poets
Swedish women dramatists and playwrights
20th-century Swedish women writers
21st-century Swedish poets
21st-century Swedish dramatists and playwrights
21st-century Swedish women writers